Kunugia latipennis, the pine lappet moth, is a moth of the family Lasiocampidae. The species was first described by Francis Walker in 1855.

Distribution
It is found in the Indian subregion, Sri Lanka, Thailand, Vietnam, Myanmar, Sumatra, Borneo and Palawan.

Biology
The caterpillar is a major pest on pines. An outbreak of pine lappet moths was observed in the mid-altitude hills of Meghalaya, India, during May and June 2011. It is known to attack Pinus kesiya, Cupressus, Eucalyptus camaldulensis, Litchi chinensis, Mangifera indica, Mesua ferrea, Pinus elliottii, Pinus markusii, Shorea robusta, Syzygium cumini and Woodfordia fruticosa.

References

External links
Light traps could control outbreak of Pine Lappet Moths

Moths of Asia
Moths described in 1855